James Dew Chaplin,  (March 20, 1863 – August 23, 1937) was a Canadian politician.

Born in Toronto, Canada West, the son of William Lamont Chaplin and Harriet Dew, Chaplin was educated at the Public Schools and St. Catharines Collegiate Institute. A manufacturer in St. Catharines, Ontario, he was president of the Chaplin Wheel Company, Canada Axe and Harvest Tool Company, and the Wallingford Manufacturing Company. Chaplin served four years as a member of St. Catharines city council.

He was first elected to the House of Commons of Canada representing the riding of Lincoln in the 1917 federal election. A Conservative, he was re-elected in 1921, 1925, 1926, and 1930. In 1926, he was the Minister of Trade and Commerce in the short lived cabinet of Arthur Meighen.

In 1888, Chaplin married Edna Elizabeth Burgess. He died in St. Catharines at the age of 74.

His brother Alexander Dew, his son Gordon and his granddaughter Edna Anderson also served in the House of Commons.

References

1863 births
1937 deaths
Conservative Party of Canada (1867–1942) MPs
Members of the House of Commons of Canada from Ontario
Members of the King's Privy Council for Canada